Kamala Kumari (6 January 1945 – 26 July 2021), known by her mononymous stage name Jayanthi, was an Indian actress known for her work in Kannada cinema and Tamil cinema. She was noted for her contributions to different genres of films from the 1960s, 1970s and early 1980s. She had appeared in over 500 films, including films in the Kannada, Telugu, Tamil, Malayalam, Hindi and Marathi languages. She had received seven Karnataka State Film Awards, four times as Best Actress and twice as Best Supporting Actress, the President's Medal for Best Actress and two Filmfare Awards for Best Actress. She has been cited as Kannada cinema's "most bold and beautiful" actress by various media outlets, a title for which she has received substantial publicity. The Kannada film industry honored her with the title "Abhinaya Sharadhe", (Goddess Sharada in acting).

Early life
Jayanthi was born in Bellary, in the erstwhile Madras Presidency of British India on 6 January 1945. Her father Balasubramanyam worked as English professor at the St Joseph's College in Bangalore. Her mother was Santhanalakshmi. Jayanthi was the eldest of three siblings and had two younger brothers. Her parents separated when she was young and her mother took the children and moved to Madras. Jayanthi's mother was keen on making her daughter a classical dancer and hence she joined a dance school. Her friend in dance school was the famous Tamil actress Manorama.

Career

Initial struggle
As a child, Jayanthi went to the studios to see her idol N. T. Rama Rao. He called her and made her sit on his lap. Affectionately, he had asked her whether she would agree to become his heroine and the little girl had merely blushed. The pair would go on later in life to produce successful films such as Jagadeka Veeruni Katha, Kula Gowravam, Kondaveeti Simham and Justice Chowdhury. Jayanthi was ridiculed most of the time as she was plump and could never dance well. During her teens, she had the chance to act in a few Tamil and Telugu movies in bit parts. Jayanthi was shattered after the episode, but promised herself that one day she would prove her worth. Jayanthi's life changed when noted film director Y. R. Swamy spotted her during one of her dance rehearsals and cast her in his film Jenu Goodu after persuading her unrelenting mother who gave in after the former's third visit to her house. He also gave her the stage name. Jayanthi enjoyed a good run in the Kannada Film industry. She has costarred in more than 40 movies with Rajkumar, the doyen of Kannada cinema .

Rise to fame
Jenu Goodu, Jayanthi's first Kannada film was commercial success. Her next Kannada film as heroine was T. V. Singh Thakur's Chandavalliya Thota, the first film that paired her with Rajkumar. Based on T. R. Subba Rao's novel the film was a huge success and even won the President's Medal for Best Film in Kannada. The next major film that Jayanthi starred in was the 1965 Miss Leelavathi directed by M. R. Vittal in which she played the title role. Considered a film with a "bold theme" in what was seen as the conservative cinema at the time, the film dealt with the influence of parental differences and of a lead heroine who grows up to be a rebel and stands up against convention, refusing marriage, opting to be career-oriented women and with a carefree attitude towards premarital sex. Jayanthi was launched as the glamour-diva in the film, a first for a Kannada film, wearing skirts, T-shirts and nighties. The film was a huge success and catapulted Jayanthi to fame. She is credited with being the first Kannada actress to wear a swimsuit on screen, which the producers' first choice for the role had refused to do. The film won Jayanthi the President's award. Jayanthi recalled the occasion in one of her interviews when she received the award from Indira Gandhi (then the Ministry of Information and Broadcasting), who, after giving away the award called back Jayanthi and gave her a kiss and wished her good luck.

She did Tamil films from 1962 to 1979 as leading lady, frequently paired opposite Gemini Ganesan and Nagesh in Tamil. In Tamil she acted with all major stars including M.G. Ramachandran, Gemini Ganesan, Muthuraman and Jaishankar. She acted with M. G. Ramachandran in Padagotti and Mugaraasi, with Gemini Ganesan in Kanna Nalama, Velli Vizha, Punnagai, Ganga Gowri and Iru Kodugal, with Jaishankar in Nil Gavani Kadhali and Kaadhal Paduthum Paadu and Ethir Neechal with Nagesh.  She was director K. Balachander's regular actress and they went on to work in films such as Iru Kodugal, Bama Vijayam, Ethir Neechal, Punnagai, Velli Vizha and Kanna Nalama. She acted with Jayalalithaa and Manorama in the film Mugaraasi. The song Aadhi Naadan Ketkindraan picturised on her sung by TMS-Janaki was very popular.

She was married to film director Peketi Sivaram for a few years and then the couple separated. During the late 1970s and the 1980s Jayanthi starred in many Kannada movies that required a slightly mature actress, often paired with Srinivasa Murthy and Prabhakar.

On 27 March 2018, it was falsely reported by several media houses that actress Jayanthi had died. While her fans took to social media to offer their condolences, her family members refuted the rumors as false. The then 73 year old actress complained of breathing difficulties and was admitted to a private hospital in Bengaluru and was recuperating and responding well to the treatment.

Other works
In 2009, she gave her voice to an HIV/AIDS education animated software tutorial created by the nonprofit organization TeachAids.

Death
Jayanthi died on 26 July 2021 at the age of 76, due to age related ailments at her residence in Bengaluru.

Awards
Karnataka State Film Awards
 1973–74: Best Actress — Edakallu Guddada Mele
 1976–77: Best Actress — Manassinanthe Mangalya
 1981–82: Best Actress — Dharma Dari Thappithu
 1985–86: Best Actress — Masanada Hoovu
 1986–87: Best Supporting Actress — Anand
 1998–99: Best Supporting Actress — Tuvvi Tuvvi Tuvvi
 2005–06: Dr. Rajkumar Lifetime Achievement Award
Filmfare Awards South
 1973: Best Actress – Kannada — Edakallu Guddada Mele
 1976: Best Actress – Kannada — Thulasi
Others
 Padmabhushan Dr. B. Sarojadevi National Award, 2017

Partial filmography

Kannada films

 Jenu Goodu (1963)
 Sri Ramanjaneya Yuddha (1963)
 Chandavalliya Thota (1964)
 Kalaavati (1964)
 Tumbida Koda (1964)
 Muriyada Mane (1964)
 Prathigne (1964)
 Pathiye Daiva (1964)
 Kavaleradu Kula Ondu (1965)
 Beratha Jeeva (1965)
 Vaatsalya (1965)
 Bettada Huli (1965)
 Miss Leelavathi (1965)
 Mamatheya Bandhana (1966)
 Endu Ninnavane (1966)
 Mantralaya Mahatme (1966)
 Mahashilpi (1966)
 Deva Maanava (1966)
 Kiladi Ranga (1966)
 Onde Balliya Hoogalu (1967)
 Anuradha (1967)
 Nakkare Ade Swarga (1967)
 Kallu Sakkare (1967)
 Miss Bangalore (1967)
 Lagna Pathrike (1967)
 Muddu Meena (1967)
 Rajadurgada Rahasya (1967)
 Devara Gedda Manava (1967)
 Manassiddare Marga (1967)
 Chakratheertha (1967)
 Immadi Pulikeshi (1967)
 Jedara Bale (1968)
 Mateye Maha Mandira (1968)
 Bangalore Mail (1968)
 Rowdi Ranganna (1968)
 Simhaswapna (1968)
 Broker Bheeshmachari (1969)
 Bhale Basava (1969)
 Eradu Mukha (1969)
 Choori Chikkanna (1969)
 Bhaagirathi (1969)
 Punarjanma (1969)
 Maduve Maduve Maduve (1969)
 Bhale Raja (1969)
 Ade Hrudaya Ade Mamathe (1969)
 Chikkamma (1969)
 Gruhalakshmi (1969)
 Bhale Basava (1969)
 Sri Krishnadevaraya (1970)
 Kanneeru (1970)
 Sedige Sedu (1970)
 Nanna Thamma (1970)
 Baalu Belagithu (1970)
 Devara Makkalu (1970)
 Paropakari (1970)
 Sidila Mari (1971)
 Kasturi Nivasa (1971)
 Thande Makkalu (1971)
 Kula Gourava (1971)
 Sedina Kidi (1971)
 Samshaya Phala (1971)
 Kalyani (1971)
 Baala Bandhana (1971)
 Malathi Madhava (1971)
 Vishakanye (1972)
 Ondu Hennina Kathe (1972)
 Kranti Veera (1972)
 Nanda Gokula (1972)
 Devaru Kotta Thangi (1973)
 Bharatada Ratna (1973)
 Jaya Vijaya (1973)
 Edakallu Guddada Mele (1973)
 Mooruvare Vajragalu (1973)
 Mannina Magalu (1974)
 Kasturi Vijaya (1975)
 Devaru Kotta Vara (1976)
 Baduku Bangaravayithu (1976)
 Bahaddur Gandu (1976)
 Mangalya bhagya (1976)
 Thulasi (1976)
 Devara Duddu (1977)
 Manassinanthe Mangalya (1977)
 Chinna Ninna Muddaduve (1977)
 Shrimanthana Magalu (1977)
 Banashankari (1977)
 Shubhashaya (1977)
 Ganda Hendathi (1977)
 Sridevi (1978)
 Balina Guri (1979)
 Vijay Vikram (1979)
 Mallige Sampige (1979)
 Janma Janmada Anubandha (1980)
 Bhakta Gnanadeva (1982)
 Nanna Devaru (1982) (guest appearance)
 Kallu Veene Nudiyithu (1983)
 Banker Margayya (1983)
 Keralida Hennu (1983)
 Shubha Muhurtha (1984)
 Benki Birugali (1984)
 Tayi Nadu (1984)
 Masanada Hoovu (1985)
 Shiva Kotta Sowbhagya (1985)
 Agni Pareekshe (1985)
 Thayiye Nanna Devaru (1986)
 Anand (1986)
 Lancha Lancha Lancha (1986)
 Usha (1986)
 Mukhavaada (1987)
 Thayi Kotta Thali (1987)
 Thayi Karulu (1988)
 Matrudevobhava (1988)
 Nee Nanna Daiva (1988)
 En Swamy Aliyandire (1989)
 Sri Satyanarayana Puja Phala (1990)
 Sundara Kanda (1991)
 Belli Modagalu (1992)
 Jana Mechida Maga (1993)
 Rasika (1995)
 Gajanura Gandu (1996)
 Baava Baamaida (2001)
 Neela (2001)
 Shri Kalikamba (2003)
 Jambada Hudugi (2007)
 Namitha I Love You (2011)
 Sri Kshetra Adi Chunchanagiri (2012)

Tamil films
This list is incomplete; you can help by expanding it.

, rathi nirvedham’’ (1957)
 Yanai Paagan (1960)
 Mangaiyar Ullam Mangatha Selvam (1962)
 Ninaipadharku Neramillai (1963)
 Iruvar Ullam (1963)
 Manthiri Kumaran (1963)
 Annai Illam (1963)
 Padagotti (1964)
 Vazhi Piranthadu (1964)
 Karnan (1964)
 Kalai Kovil (1964)
 Veeraadhi Veeran (1964)
 Neerkumizhi (1965)
 Mugaraasi (1966)
 Karthigai Deepam (1965)
 Kathal Paduthum Padu (1966)
 Bama Vijayam (1967)
 Bhakta Prahlada (1967)
 Ethir Neechal (1968)
 Iru Kodugal (1969)
 Nil Gavani Kadhali (1969)
 Punnagai (1971)
 Nootrukku Nooru (1971)
 Pudhiya Vazhkai (1971)
 Kanna Nalama (1972)
 Velli Vizha (1972)
 Ganga Gowri (1973)
 Pennai Nambungal (1973)
 Manipayal (1973)
 Nalla Mudivu (1973)
 Shanmugapriya (1973)
 Ellorum Nallavare (1975)
 Kula Gauravam (1976)
 Devadhai (1979)
 Komberi Mookan (1984)
 Mappillai Sir (1988)
 Naanum Indha Ooruthan (1990)
 Palaivana Paravaigal (1990)
 Sir I Love You (1992)
 Rajadhi Raja Raja Kulothunga Raja Marthanda Raja Gambeera Kathavaraya Krishna Kamarajan (1993)
 Veettaippaaru Nattaippaaru (1994)
 Maindhan (1994)
  Gopala Gopala (1996)
 Sengottai (1996)
 Pudhalvan (1997)
 Housefull (1999)
 Annai Kaligambal (2003)
 Namitha I Love You (2011)

Malayalam films
 Palattu Koman (1962)
 Kattupookkal (1965)
 Kaliyodam (1965)
 Lakshaprabhu (1968)
 Karutha Pournami (1968)
 Vilakkappetta Kani (1974)
.  Oridathoru Phayalvaan (1981)

Telugu films
This list is incomplete; you can help by expanding it.

 Bharya Bhartalu (1961)
 Jagadeka Veeruni Katha (1961)
 Doctor Chakravarty (1964)
 Thotalo Pilla Kotalo Rani (1964)
 Bobbili Yuddham (1964)
 Aggi Pidugu (1964)
 Sumangali (1965)
 Rahasyam (1967)
 Bhakta Prahlada (1967)
 Bandipotu Dongalu (1968)
 Devudichchina Bharta (1968)
 Bhale Kodallu (1968)
 Badi Panthulu (1972)
 Collector Janaki (1972)
 Mayadari Malligadu (1973)
 Sarada (1973)
 Samsaram Sagaram (1973)
 Gandhi Puttina Desam (1973)
 Bangaru Babu (1973)
 Devadasu (1974)
 Amma Manasu (1974)
 Kula Gowravam (1972)
 Devudu Chesina Pelli (1974)
 Challani Thalli (1975)
 Ramayya Thandri (1975)
 Chinninati Kalalu (1975)
 Sri Ramanjaneya Yuddham (1975)
 Bommarillu (1978)
 Kumara Raja (1978)
 Bottu Kaatuka (1979)
 Kamalamma Kamatam (1979)
  Anthuleni Vintha Katha (1979)
 Talli Badhyatha (1980)
 Kondaveeti Simham (1981)
 Parvati Parameshwarulu (1981)
 Agni Poolu (1981)
 Justice Chowdary (1982)
 Rakta Sambandham (1984)
 Santhi Nivasam (1986)
 Dhairyavanthudu (1986)
 Kaliyuga Pandavulu (1986)
 Donga Mogudu (1987)
 Allari Krishnaiah (1987)
 Maavoori Magaadu (1987)
 Kodama Simham (1990)
 Raja Vikramarka (1990)
 Talli Tandrulu (1991)
 Swati Kiranam (1992)
 Gharana Bullodu (1995)
 Pedarayudu (1995)
 Vamshanikokkadu (1996)
 Ramudochadu (1996)
 Rowdy Darbar (1997)
 Kante Koothurne Kanu (1998)
 Raghavayya Gari Abbayi (2000)
 Girl Friend (2002)
 Neeke Manasichaanu (2003)
 786 Khaidi Premakatha (2005)
 Namitha I Love You (2011)

Hindi films
  Lal Bangla  (1966)
 Teen Bahuraniyan (1968)
 Gunda (1970)
 Tumse Achha Kaun Hai (1969)

English shows
Brown Nation (2016)

TV serials
 Vasantham (2009-2010) as Mangalam (Tamil)
 Amrutha Varshini as Janaki Devi (Kannada)
 Onde Goodina Halligalu (Kannada)

References

External links
 

1945 births
2021 deaths
Indian film actresses
Actresses in Kannada cinema
Actresses in Tamil cinema
Actresses in Telugu cinema
Actresses in Malayalam cinema
Actresses in Hindi cinema
People from Bellary
Filmfare Awards South winners
Kannada actresses
20th-century Indian actresses
21st-century Indian actresses
Actresses in Marathi cinema
Indian women playback singers
Singers from Karnataka
20th-century Indian singers
Indian women film producers
Film producers from Karnataka
20th-century Indian women singers
Film musicians from Karnataka
21st-century Indian women singers
21st-century Indian singers
Businesswomen from Karnataka